Afraciura quaternaria is a species of tephritid or fruit flies in the genus Afraciura of the family Tephritidae.

Distribution
Tanzania, Kenya, Malawi, Zimbabwe, Lesotho, South Africa.

References

Tephritinae
Insects described in 1924
Taxa named by Mario Bezzi
Diptera of Africa